1184 is the third studio album by Windir, released in 2001. Valfar  composed this album with the band Ulcus. Departing from the sound for which Windir is normally known, it nevertheless kept its folk elements, albeit with inspiration from electronic music. This release provoked divided reactions, with some praising it as a great Windir album which reached new creative heights, while others felt consternation at the departure of the sound for which Windir was recognised and admired in black metal circles. The art used in the album cover is a painting by the Norwegian artist Johan Christian Dahl called "Winter at the Sognefjord".

Track listing
All songs written and arranged by Valfar & Hvåll.

Personnel

Windir
 Terje Bakken (Valfar) – vocals, accordion, programming, additional bass guitar, guitar and synthesizer
 Strom – lead guitar
 Sture – rhythm guitar
 Righ – synthesizer
 Hvàll – bass guitar
 Steingrim – drums

Additional personnel
 Cosmocrator – clean vocals

Production
 Produced, recorded, engineered and mixed by Thorbjørn Akkerhaugen, Valfar and Hvåll
 Mastered by Tom Kvalsvoll

References

External links
 1184 at Discogs

Windir albums
2001 albums